Barrow Gurney is a village and civil parish in Somerset, England, situated in the unitary authority of North Somerset on the B3130, midway between the A38 and A370 near the Long Ashton bypass and Bristol Airport,  south west of Bristol city centre. The civil parish includes Barrow Common, and has a population of 349.

It is close to Barrow Gurney Reservoirs, which supply drinking water for Bristol, and feed the Land Yeo which runs alongside the B3130 through the village. It was also the site of Barrow Hospital.

History

The Domesday Book of 1086 records that Barrow Gurney was held by Nigel de Gournay, who would have won his lands in Englishcombe, Twerton, Swainswick and Barrow Gurney by fighting for William I of England. His original home must have been Gournay, which was half-way between Dieppe and Paris.

The parish was part of the hundred of Hartcliffe.

A Benedictine nunnery was established here about the commencement of the 13th century by one of the Fitz-Hardinges (or Fitzhardinge).

Thomas de Gournay was involved with the murder of Edward II at Berkeley Castle in 1327.

There were three mills on the Land Yeo in Barrow Gurney. The Upper Barrow Mill, which had an Overshot water wheel, was a Gristmill which is known to have been operating in 1839. By 1866 it was running as a corn mill, and ceased operation by 1935. The Middle Mill was converted to snuff manufacture by Peter Lilly a tobacconist from Bristol around 1800 and became part of the W.D. & H.O. Wills tobacco manufacturing company. It ceased mill operations by 1839 and by 1885 both the leat and millpond had disappeared. The Lower Mill is known have been grinding corn in the 19th century. It was rebuilt in 1909 when an iron overshot watermill of  diameter was installed and steam power introduced. The mill is still used to produce animal feeds, however the waterwheel and millpond, which remain, are no longer in use.

Barrow Hospital (sometimes referred to as Barrow Gurney Hospital) was a psychiatric hospital which opened in the 1930s. In Second World War the hospital was commandeered by the Royal Navy and became a Royal Naval Auxiliary Hospital before being transferred to the National Health Service in 1948. In 2003 the Avon and Wiltshire Mental Health Partnership NHS Trust announced its intention to close Barrow Hospital by 2008. In 2008 planning permission was granted build 18 luxury homes and 405,000sq ft of office space on the southern part of the site. In 2010, plans were amended to include a 220-bed care home 'village' on the northern part of the site, more housing and fewer offices.

Governance

The parish council has responsibility for local issues, including setting an annual precept (local rate) to cover the council’s operating costs and producing annual accounts for public scrutiny. The parish council evaluates local planning applications and works with the local police, district council officers, and neighbourhood watch groups on matters of crime, security, and traffic. The parish council's role also includes initiating projects for the maintenance and repair of parish facilities, such as the village hall or community centre, playing fields and playgrounds, as well as consulting with the district council on the maintenance, repair, and improvement of highways, drainage, footpaths, public transport, and street cleaning. Conservation matters (including trees and listed buildings) and environmental issues are also of interest to the council.

The parish falls within the unitary authority of North Somerset which was created in 1996, as established by the Local Government Act 1992. It provides a single tier of local government with responsibility for almost all local government functions within its area including local planning and building control, local roads, council housing, environmental health, markets and fairs, refuse collection, recycling, cemeteries, crematoria, leisure services, parks, and tourism. They are also responsible for education, social services, libraries, main roads, public transport, Trading Standards, waste disposal and strategic planning, although fire, police and ambulance services are provided jointly with other authorities through the Avon Fire and Rescue Service, Avon and Somerset Constabulary and the South Western Ambulance Service.

North Somerset's area covers part of the ceremonial county of Somerset but it is administered independently of the non-metropolitan county. Its administrative headquarters is in the town hall in Weston-super-Mare. Between 1 April 1974 and 1 April 1996, it was the Woodspring district of the county of Avon. Before 1974 that the parish was part of the Long Ashton Rural District.

The parish is represented in the House of Commons of the Parliament of the United Kingdom as part of the North Somerset constituency. It elects one Member of Parliament (MP) by the first past the post system of election, currently Liam Fox of the Conservative Party. It was also part of the South West England constituency of the European Parliament prior to Britain leaving the European Union in January 2020, which elected seven MEPs using the d'Hondt method of party-list proportional representation.

Religious sites

The parish Church of St Mary and St Edward and Barrow Court manor house chapel have 12th-century origins but were virtually rebuilt by Henry Woodyer 1887–90 for Henry Martin Gibbs son of William Gibbs of Tyntesfield. It has been designated as a Grade II* listed building.

Culture

It is mentioned in the song 'Drink up thy Zider' by The Wurzels - the reference is to going to see his brother Ernie in the Barrow Hospital.

Barrow Gurney Cricket Club was founded in 1874 and moved to its current site in Hobbs Lane in the 1950s, recent improvements to the pavilion and grounds have made it widely considered as one of the most attractive places in play cricket in North Somerset. The club currently has 2 adult teams playing in the Bristol & District League and a Midweek team playing in the Bristol Midweek League. All teams are open to male and female players.

It is well known in the Bristol area as a shortcut to Bristol Airport, despite very narrow roads and heavy traffic calming measures that are clearly intended to discourage this.

See also

 Barrow Gurney Reservoirs

References

External links

 Village Barrow Gurney Parish Council | Home page
 map of Barrow Gurney circa 1900
 
  Barrow Gurney Cricket Club Home Page

Civil parishes in Somerset
Villages in North Somerset